Namibia held elections for their local and regional councils on 27 November 2015. Ballots were cast using electronic voting.

Electoral system
Elections to regional councils are held using the first-past-the-post electoral system. Voters in each constituency elect one councillor to represent them on their regional council. Local authority councillors are elected by a system of proportional representation.

Results
Regional and local elections taken together elected 199 woman out of the 499 available seats, partly because affirmative action for women is required by law in local authority elections.

Regional elections
There are 121 constituency councillors to be elected. In twenty-eight of them SWAPO was announced as winner in October because no opposition party nominated a candidate.

Local election
Local elections determine the population of the village, town, and city councils and have a direct influence on who will become mayor, as this position is elected among all councillors. Contrary to the regional elections, local elections in Namibia are determined by party, not by individual. There are 57 local authorities to be elected. In five of them (Okahao, Omuthiyagwiipundi, Oniipa, Outapi and Tsandi) SWAPO was announced as winner in October because no opposition party nominated a candidate.

References

2015 in Namibia
Local and regional elections in Namibia
Namibia